Harrisville Township may refer to the following places in the United States:

 Harrisville Township, Medina County, Ohio
 Harrisville Township, Michigan

Township name disambiguation pages